Eurolophosaurus is a genus of reptiles belonging to the family Tropiduridae.

The species of this genus are found in Southern America.

Species
Species:

Eurolophosaurus amathites  – Amathites lava lizard
Eurolophosaurus divaricatus 
Eurolophosaurus nanuzae  – Rodrigues's lava lizard

References

Eurolophosaurus
Lizard genera